Freddie Ray Marshall (born August 22, 1928) is an American economist who is the professor emeritus and Audre and Bernard Rapoport Centennial Chair in Economics and Public Affairs at the University of Texas at Austin.

Early life and education 
Marshall was born in 1928 in Oak Grove, Louisiana and had lived in an orphanage. Marshall joined the United States Navy in 1943 when he was fifteen years old and served during World War II. He earned a Bachelor of Arts degree from Millsaps College, a Master of Arts from Louisiana State University, and a PhD in economics from the University of California, Berkeley in economics. As a PhD student, Marshall's research was supervised by Walter Galenson.

Career 
He has held several academic posts, but since 1962 has been at the University of Texas, with the exception of his term as United States Secretary of Labor as a member of Jimmy Carter's Administration. As Secretary of Labor, he expanded public service and job-training programs, as a part of Carter's economic stimulus program. Marshall was also one of the founders of the Economic Policy Institute in 1986.

Books 
 F. Ray Marshall, Labor in the South, Harvard University Press, 1967. .
 
 Editor: Back to Shared Prosperity: The Growing Inequality of Wealth and Income in America, .

References

External links 
 U.S. Department of Labor Marshall biography
 

|-

1928 births
20th-century American politicians
Carter administration cabinet members
Economic Policy Institute
Living people
Louisiana State University alumni
Military personnel from Louisiana
Millsaps College alumni
People from Oak Grove, Louisiana
University of California, Berkeley alumni
University of Texas at Austin faculty
Writers from Louisiana
United States Navy personnel of World War II